Andrey Sergeyevich Savin (born 30 August 1999) is a Russian football player. He plays for FC Lokomotiv Moscow.

Club career
He made his debut for FC Lokomotiv Moscow on 31 August 2022 in a Russian Cup game against FC Pari Nizhny Novgorod.

Career statistics

References

External links
 
 
 
 

1999 births
Sportspeople from Kirov, Kirov Oblast
Living people
Russian footballers
Russia youth international footballers
Association football goalkeepers
FC Dynamo Kirov players
FC Nosta Novotroitsk players
FC Lokomotiv Moscow players
Russian Second League players